

Champions
World Series: Boston Red Sox over Chicago Cubs (4–2)

MLB statistical leaders

Major league baseball final standings

American League final standings

National League final standings

Events

January

February

March
 March 23 - The Boston Red Sox played an exhibition game against the Brooklyn Dodgers at the Army cantonment at Camp Pike in Arkansas featuring Babe Ruth hitting five home runs and spawning the Boston American headline: “Babe Ruth Puts Five Over Fence, Heretofore Unknown to Baseball Fans.”

April
April 15 – The American League season opened with Boston Red Sox ace Babe Ruth pitching a four-hit, 7–1 victory over the Philadelphia Athletics. Shortly after, Boston manager Ed Barrow started Ruth's conversion to slugger by working him into seventy-two games as an outfielder–first baseman.
April 18 – Cleveland Indians center fielder Tris Speaker turned an unassisted double play against the Detroit Tigers. Eleven days later, Speaker duplicated the feat against the Chicago White Sox for the fourth unassisted double play of his career to set a franchise record for an outfielder that he would later share with teammate Elmer Smith.

May
May 14 – Sunday baseball was officially legalized in Washington, D.C. after district commissioners finally rescinded the ban in response to the large increase in the city's wartime population and the need for more recreational activities.

May 19 - Babe Ruth fell ill.  His temperature climbed to 104 degrees, his body ached, he shivered with chills, and his throat throbbed. He had all the symptoms of the Spanish Flu, but was treated with silver nitrate for tonsillitis which worsened his condition to the point where he was admitted to Massachusetts General Hospital.  After a significant scare, he recovered about a week later. 

May 23 - General Enoch Crowder, provost marshal of the Army who constructed the Selective Service Act, commonly known as “the draft," issued an order that stated young men should get into essential work by July 1st or face induction into the armed services.  The "Work or Fight" rule exempted theatrical performers such as actors, singers and musicians because they provided "essential recreation" but baseball players got no such exemption.

June
June 3 – Dutch Leonard tosses the second no-hitter of his career, leading the Boston Red Sox to a 5–0 victory over the Detroit Tigers.
June 5 - Lieutenant Leon Cadore on leave from his military duties, throws a four hitter for Brooklyn as the Dodgers beat the Cardinals, 2-0 at Ebbets Field, while on furlough, Cadore appeared in two games for the Dodgers this season.
June 13 – St. Louis Cardinals outfielder Cliff Heathcote hits for the cycle against the Philadelphia Phillies.  The game would be called for darkness with the score tied 8–8.

July
 July 19 - Newton Baker, Secretary of War, re-affirmed the position that baseball was not essential following an appeal by Washington Senators catcher Eddie Ainsmith and that players must take an essential job or be drafted. 
July 27 Appearing in his first and only game in the majors, relief pitcher Harry Heitmann gives up four hits to each of the four batters he faces in Brooklyn's 22-7 loss to the St. Louis Cardinals. Heitmann is pulled from the game and never appears again, making him the only known major league pitcher whose E.R.A. is infinity.

August
August 1 – The Pittsburgh Pirates and the Boston Braves went head-to-head for a major-league record twenty scoreless innings. Marathon man Art Nehf went the distance for Boston, but was eventually beaten 2–0 in the twenty-first inning.
August 9 – Cincinnati Reds manager Christy Mathewson suspended Hal Chase indefinitely after suspecting him of taking bribes to fix games. Chase was eventually reinstated and returned to play for the New York Giants in 1919.
August 30 – Carl Mays pitched two nine-inning complete game victories on the same day, as the Boston Red Sox bested the Philadelphia Athletics 12–0 and 4–1 at Fenway Park. Mays finished with a 21-13 record, as the season is abbreviated because of World War I. Those wins put the Red Sox one step from clinching the American League championship, as they led the Cleveland Indians by 3 1/2 games with four remaining to play en route to the 1918 World Series title.

September
September 1 – During the regular season, Washington Senators ace Walter Johnson completed fifteen extra inning games, including two of eighteen innings, one of sixteen innings, and another of fifteen innings.

September 2 - The date  upon which the regular season ended early following a compromise between Presidents Ban Johnson of the American League and John K. Tener of the National League with Secretary of War Newton Baker and General Enoch Crowder 

September 5 – During the 7th inning stretch in Game 1 of the World Series, a military band played the "Star Spangled Banner" as a tribute to all servicemen on leave and in attendance. From then on, the song was played at every World Series outing and every season opener, though it was not yet adopted as the national anthem. The custom of playing it before every game began during World War II, after the installation of stadium speaker systems made it more feasible.
September 11 – Against the backdrop of World War I, which forced the premature ending to the regular season on September 2, the Boston Red Sox defeated the Chicago Cubs, 2–1, in Game 6 of the World Series to win their fifth world championship, and third in four years, four games to two.  The Red Sox would not win another championship for the next 86 years.

October
October 5 – National League infielder Eddie Grant became the first major league player killed in wartime action while leading a mission in the Meuse–Argonne Offensive to rescue the Lost Battalion, which was trapped behind German lines. Other players killed in World War I included Alex Burr, Larry Chappell, Ralph Sharman, and Bun Troy.

November

December

Births

January
January 5 – Jack Kramer
January 6 – John Corriden
January 6 – Bill Zinser
January 8 – Alma Ziegler
January 9 – Ferrell Anderson
January 10 – Bill Lillard
January 11 – Ernie Andres
January 11 – Al Gardella
January 13 – Everett Fagan
January 13 – Steve Mesner
January 13 – Emmett O'Neill
January 23 – Randy Gumpert
January 23 – Sam Jethroe
January 23 – Chris Pelekoudas
January 25 – Ernie Harwell
January 25 – Ed Head
January 25 – Steve Roser
January 29 – Bill Rigney
January 31 – Sid Peterson

February
February 3 – Sid Schacht
February 3 – Quincy Smith
February 5 – Cy Buker
February 6 – Ernie Kish
February 8 – Cookie Cuccurullo
February 8 – Butch Nieman
February 12 – Monk Dubiel
February 13 – Norm Wallen
February 14 – Benny Zientara
February 16 – Creepy Crespi
February 18 – José Antonio Casanova
February 22 – Charles O. Finley
February 22 – Jackie Sullivan
February 23 – Jim Carlin
February 23 – Hillis Layne
February 25 – George Diehl

March
March 1 – Hank Wyse
March 2 – Frank Colman
March 3 – Bill Hoffman
March 3 – Forrest Thompson
March 4 – Mel Queen
March 9 – Dale Alderson
March 11 – Lyman Bostock
March 11 – Ed Fernandes
March 13 – Eddie Pellagrini
March 14 – Arnold Carter
March 16 – Vern Olsen
March 18 – Ruby Knezovich
March 18 – Dick Mulligan
March 21 – Ed Klieman
March 22 – Bill Butland
March 22 – Carl Miles
March 23 – Lou Lucier
March 31 – Marv Grissom

April
April 4 – Carlos Ascanio
April 7 – Bobby Doerr
April 8 – Bob Mavis
April 12 – Chucho Ramos
April 19 – Whitey Kurowski
April 19 – Vidal López
April 21 – Jack Brewer
April 22 – Marshall Riddle
April 22 – Mickey Vernon
April 25 – Tex Shirley
April 26 – Jack Kraus
April 27 – John Rice
April 30 – Louella Daetweiler

May
May 2 – Berith Melin
May 5 – John Leovich
May 7 – Al Epperly
May 11 – Dewey Adkins
May 12 – Ed Runge
May 13 – Carden Gillenwater
May 13 – Lonnie Goldstein
May 14 – Wimpy Quinn
May 18 – Dewey Adkins
May 18 – Rufe Gentry
May 21 – Stan Goletz
May 21 – Neb Stewart
May 23 – Frank Mancuso
May 25 – Johnny Beazley
May 28 – Bob Malloy
May 29 – Bill Burich

June
June 5 – Al Javery
June 5 – Dave Odom
June 12 – Bitsy Mott
June 17 – Pete Elko
June 21 – Eddie Lopat
June 26 – Elmer Singleton

July
July 1 – Al Tate
July 6 – Hal Marnie
July 10 – Chuck Stevens
July 18 – Al Lyons
July 21 – Chet Hajduk
July 23 – Pee Wee Reese
July 23 – Walter Sessi
July 28 – Ross Davis
July 30 – Jack Conway

August
August 4 – Don Kolloway
August 4 – Frank McElyea
August 8 – Red Roberts
August 8 – Marlin Stuart
August 12 – Charlie Gassaway
August 13 – Elmer Weingartner
August 23 – Ken Holcombe
August 23 – Ed Murphy
August 23 – Rocky Stone
August 25 – Paul Busby
August 28 – Jeff Cross
August 28 – Ronny Miller
August 29 – Garland Lawing
August 29 – Joe Schultz
August 30 – Billy Johnson
August 30 – Ted Williams

September
September 1 – Joe L. Brown
September 1 – Jim Mallory
September 2 – Len Rice
September 4 – Bill Endicott
September 4 – George Pfister
September 9 – Woody Crowson
September 11 – Randy Heflin
September 11 – Marjorie Peters
September 12 – Al Libke
September 17 – Bob Dillinger
September 26 – Walt Chipple
September 30 – Jim Castiglia

October
October 1 – Jim Russell
October 4 – Red Munger
October 6 – Jimmy Grant
October 7 – Frank Baumholtz
October 7 – Irv Hall
October 11 – Bob Chipman
October 15 – Austin Knickerbocker
October 17 – Howie Moss
October 18 – Fred Vaughn
October 21 – Ralph McCabe
October 22 – Fred Caligiuri
October 22 – Lou Klein
October 25 – Nanny Fernandez
October 26 – Snuffy Stirnweiss
October 27 – Ed Albosta
October 30 – Tony Ordeñana

November
November 1 – Héctor Benítez
November 1 – Lefty Sloat
November 3 – Joe Cleary
November 3 – Bob Feller
November 5 – Rogelio Martínez
November 10 – John Henry Moss
November 21 – Dorothy Maguire
November 27 – Pat Capri
November 28 – Russ Meers
November 30 – Janice O'Hara

December
December 1 – Lefty Sloat
December 3 – Joe Cleary
December 4 – William Metzig
December 8 – Sam Zoldak
December 9 – Clarence Beers
December 17 – Johanna Hageman
December 17 – Dale Jones
December 19 – Bill DeKoning
December 19 – Tommy O'Brien
December 22 – Bill Kennedy
December 31 – Fats Dantonio
December 31 – Al Lakeman

Deaths

January
January 9 – George Ulrich, 48, National League outfielder who played between 1892 and 1896 for the Washington Senators, Cincinnati Reds and New York Giants.
January 24 – Mike Gaule, 48, outfielder for the 1889 Louisville Colonels of the American Association.

February
February 2 – Jack Crooks, 52, second baseman who played with four different teams between 1889 and 1896, and also managed the 1892 St. Louis Browns of the National League.
February 5 – Carl Druhot, 35, pitcher who played from 1906 to 1907 for the Cincinnati Reds and St. Louis Cardinals.
February 21 – John Fogarty, 53, outfielder for the 1885 St. Louis Maroons of the National League.

March
March 2 – George Kaiserling, 24, pitcher who played from 1914 through 1915 with the Indianapolis Hoosiers and the Newark Pepper of the Federal League.
March 4 – Lon Ury, 40, first baseman for the 1903 St. Louis Cardinals.
March 10 – Jim McCormick, 61, pitcher who posted a 265–214 record with a 2.43 ERA for six different teams between 1878 and 1897, who is regarded as the first ballplayer born in Glasgow to appear in a major league game.
March 22 – Jim Holdsworth, 67, shortstop for seven different teams in a nine season career that spanned between 1870 and 1884.
March 24 – Jack Farrell, 25, second baseman who played from 1914 to 1915 for the Chicago Whales.

April
April 6 – Bill Bowman, 49, catcher for the 1891 Chicago Colts.
April 6 – Newt Halliday, 21, first baseman for the 1916 Pittsburgh Pirates.
April 9 – Ed Wilkinson, 27, outfielder and infielder for the 1912 New York Highlanders of the American League.
April 10 – Owen Shannon, 38, backup catcher for the 1907 Washington Senators of the American League.
April 25 – Dave Williams, 37, pitcher for the 1902 Boston Americans of the American League.

May
May 4 – Maury Uhler, 31, outfielder for the 1914 Cincinnati Reds.
May 15 – Patsy Tebeau, 53, a 19th-century infielder/manager for the Cleveland and St. Louis National League teams.
May 24 – Chris McFarland, 56, outfielder for the 1884 Baltimore Monumentals of the Union Association.
May 24 – Ralph Sharman, 23, outfielder for the 1917 Philadelphia Athletics, who drowned while serving in World War I.
May 26 – George Bone, 43, shortstop for the 1901 Milwaukee Brewers of the American League.

June
June 11 – Mike Hickey, 46, second baseman who appeared in one game for the 1899 Boston Beaneaters of the National League.
June 12 – Larry Ressler, 69, outfielder who played during the 1875 season for the Washington Nationals of the National Association, who is recognized as the first player born in France to play in American professional baseball.
June 14 – George Wheeler, 36, pinch hitter who played in three games for the Cincinnati Reds in the 1910 season.
June 21 – Davy Force, 68, shortstop who posted a .249 average with 1060 hits and 653 runs scored in 1029 games for nine different teams between 1871 and 1886.
June 25 – Jake Beckley, 50, owner of the major league record for career games as a first baseman, a .308 career hitter who retired with the second most hits in major league history.

July
July 21 – Larry Pape, 35, pitcher who posted a 12–9 record and a 2.81 ERA for the Boston Red Sox in part of three seasons between 1909 and 1912 and later pitched for Triple-A Buffalo Bisons in 1913.

August
August 3 – Mike Lawlor, 64, catcher for the NL Troy Trojans in 1880 and the UA Washington Nationals in 1884.

September
September 10 – Ed Cassian, 50, pitcher for the NL Philadelphia Phillies and the UA Washington Statesmen during the 1891 season.
September 12 – Ernie Beam, 51, pitcher for the 1895 Philadelphia Phillies.
September 28 – John Frill, 39, pitcher for the New York Highlanders, St. Louis Browns and Cincinnati Reds between 1910 and 1912.

October
October 4 – Phil Routcliffe, 47, Canadian outfielder who played for the 1890 Pittsburgh Alleghenys of the National League.
October 5 – Eddie Grant, 35, infielder for the Cleveland Naps, Phiildelphia Phillies, Cincinnati Reds and New York Giants between 1905 and 1917, who was killed in action while serving in World War I.
October 7 – Bun Troy, 30, German-born pitcher for 1912 Detroit Tigers, who was killed in action while serving with the U.S. Army during World War I.
October 9 – Fred Gaiser, 33, German pitcher who played for the St. Louis Cardinals during the 1908 season.
October 10 – George LeClair, 31, Canadian pitcher who played from 1914 to 1915 in the Federal League with the Pittsburgh Rebels, Buffalo Blues and Baltimore Terrapins.
October 12 – Alex Burr, 24, outfielder for the 1914 New York Yankees, who was killed in an airplane accident while serving in World War I.
October 12 – Harry Glenn, 28, backup catcher for the 1915 St. Louis Cardinals.
October 18 – Tom Reilly, 34, shortstop in parts of three seasons with the St. Louis Cardinals (1908–1909) and the Cleveland Naps (1914).
October 21 – Harry Chapman, 30, catcher who played in three different leagues from 1912 to 1916 for the Chicago Cubs,  Cincinnati Reds, St. Louis Terriers and St. Louis Browns.
October 26 – Charlie Rhodes, 33, who pitched for the Cardinals and Reds between 1906 and 1909.
October 31 – Charlie Hilsey, 54, pitcher and outfielder who played for the NL Philadelphia Quakers (1883) and the AA Philadelphia Athletics (1884).

November
November 7 – Mike Tiernan, 51, right fielder who played exclusively for the New York Giants from 1887 through 1899, compiling a .311 average with 106 home runs, 853 RBI, 1316 runs and 428 stolen bases in 1478 games.
November 8 – Larry Chappell, 28, outfielder for the Chicago White Sox, Cleveland Indians and Boston Braves from 1913 to 1917, who died in an army camp from the Spanish flu pandemic while serving in World War I.

December
December 4 – Walt Dickson, 40, who pitched from 1910 through 1915 for the Boston Braves, Pittsburgh Rebels and New York Giants.
December 8 – Ed Mincher, 67, National Association outfielder who played from 1868 to 1872 for the Baltimore Marylands, Fort Wayne Kekiongas and Washington Nationals.
December 10 – Lester Dole, 63, outfielder for the 1875 New Haven Elm Citys of the National Association.
December 13 – Frank Arellanes, 36, Mexican-American pitcher for the Boston Red Sox from 1908 to 1910, who died in San Jose, California, victim of the Spanish flu pandemic.
December 20 – Silk O'Loughlin, 48, American League umpire since 1902 who worked in a record ten no-hitters and introduced the practice of shouting calls for balls, strikes and outs.
December 25 – Bob Blakiston, 63, outfielder who played from 1882 to 1884 in the American Association for the Philadelphia Athletics and Indianapolis Hoosiers.

Sources

External links

Baseball Almanac - Major League Baseball Players Who Were Born in 1918
Baseball Almanac - Major League Baseball Players Who Died in 1918
Baseball Reference - 1918 MLB Season Summary  
ESPN - 1918 MLB Season History